The earliest recorded family member was Otto von Rohr (c. 1350–1427), the German Bishop of Havelberg from 1401 to 1427. The Von Rohrs are Swedish House of Nobility noble family number 807 and Finnish House of Nobility noble family number 85.

von Rohr may also refer to:
  (1421–1487), Salzburg archbishop
 Ferdinand von Rohr (1783–1851), Prussian general and minister of war
  (born 1944), German geographer and educator
  (1895–1988), Officer
 Hans Joachim von Rohr (1888–1971), German politician
 Hans Christoffer von Rohr (1626–1700), Swedish captain ennobled in the Swedish House of Nobility who died in the Battle of Narva
 Hans-Babo von Rohr (1922–1945), German lieutenant
 Joachim von Rohr (1677–1757), Swedish lieutenant colonel and commander
  (1688–1742), Saxon cameralist, natural scientist and writer
  (1843–1910), Prussian politician
 Moritz von Rohr (1868–1940), German optical scientist
 Otto von Rohr (bass) (1914–1982), German opera singer
 Wilhelm Eugen Ludwig Ferdinand von Rohr (1783–1851), Prussian general and minister of war
 Chris von Rohr (born 1951), Swiss musician

von Röhr
 Julius Philip Benjamin von Röhr (1737–1793), Prussian botanist and plant collector, naturalist, medical doctor and watercolourist

See also 
 Röhr (surname)

Bavarian noble families
Swedish nobility
Swedish noble families
Finnish noble families